Egypt competed at the 2004 Summer Paralympics in Athens, Greece. The team included 46 athletes, 36 men and 10 women. The Egyptian team included 46 sportspeople, 10 women and 36 men.  This was 2 fewer women than the country had sent to Sydney for the 2000 Games.  Three members of the delegation, including two athletes, participated in a study about dental health during the Games.

Medallists

Sports

Athletics

Men's field

Women's field

Powerlifting

Men

Women

Table tennis

Men

Volleyball
The men's team won a bronze medal after defeating Germany in the bronze medal game.

Players
Abd Elaal Abd Elaal
Ashraf Abdalla
Abdel Naby Abdel Latif
Mohamed Abou Elyazid
Tamer Awad
Taher El Bahaey
Rezk El Helbawi
Hesham El Shwikh
Mohamed Emara
Salah Hassanein
Yassir Ibrahim
Hossam Massoud

Tournament

Media 
Egyptian broadcasting rights for the 2004 Games were acquired before the start of the Games.

See also
Egypt at the Paralympics
Egypt at the 2004 Summer Olympics

References 

Nations at the 2004 Summer Paralympics
2004
Summer Paralympics